John James Pullinger  (born 1 June 1959) was the National Statistician for the United Kingdom, serving in this role from 1 July 2014 until retiring on 30 June 2019. He was succeeded on an interim basis by Deputy National Statistician Jonathan Athow, and by Sir Ian Diamond on a permanent basis from October 2019. He became Chairman of the Electoral Commission on 1 May 2021.

Career 
Pullinger was a statistician in the Central Statistical Office and later the Office for National Statistics from 1980, finally rising to Director of Social Statistics in 1996. In 2004 he became the Director-General of Information Services and Librarian of the House of Commons. He was the President of the Royal Statistical Society for 2013–14.

In 2014, Pullinger was appointed to replace Dame Jil Matheson as the British National Statistician and the Permanent Secretary-graded Chief Executive of the UK Statistics Authority. As of 2015, Pullinger was paid a salary of between £150,000 and £154,999, making him one of the 328 most highly paid people in the British public sector at that time.

On May 1, 2021, Pullinger became Chairman of the Electoral Commission.

Education and honours 
Pullinger was educated at Alleyn's School, Dulwich, the University of Exeter and Harvard Business School. In the 2014 New Year Honours, Pullinger was appointed Companion of the Order of the Bath (CB) "for services to Parliament and voluntary service to the community through Great Culverden Park Ltd."

In 2016, Pullinger was awarded an honorary degree from the University of Exeter for outstanding achievements in the field of statistics and also received an honorary degree from the University of Essex. In 2018, he received an Honorary Degree from the University of the West of England.

References 

Presidents of the Royal Statistical Society
1959 births
Living people
Companions of the Order of the Bath
English statisticians
People educated at Alleyn's School
Alumni of the University of Exeter
Harvard Business School alumni
Directors of the Office for National Statistics
People associated with the University of Essex
People associated with the University of the West of England, Bristol